The Last Ride is a 1944 American crime film directed by D. Ross Lederman. According to Warner Bros accounts the film earned $249,000 domestically and $8,000 foreign.

Plot
The film, made during World War II, is about a "tire bootlegging" ring. The United States was largely cut off from foreign rubber supplies during the war, so tires and other rubber products were rationed on the home front. The bootleggers trafficked in rubber on the black market. As part of that, they stole good tires off people's cars, then made and sold almost worthless tires that looked good but contained very little real rubber.

In the story, after a set of fake tires causes a fatal crash, police launch a murder investigation. Detective Pat Harrigan is assigned to lead the probe. Two people are able to identify the men who sold the illegal goods, but the criminals kill these witnesses by planting a car bomb, making it impossible to take the case to court.

Pat, the detective, is living in a house owned by Kitty Kelly and her mother. Pat's brother Mike has been dating Kitty, but both Pat and Kitty are concerned about Mike's apparent sympathy for criminals. They talk to him about how tire bootleggers are harming innocent people and undermining the war effort, but their words seem to fall on deaf ears.

To break the case, Pat pretends to be dishonest, accepts a bribe from the gang and gets himself fired from the department. He's actually working undercover, infiltrating the gang and trying to find the mastermind who operates in the shadows. Everyone who knows Pat is shocked at his apparent turn to criminality, and even his cynical brother begins to feel pangs of conscience.

When Pat uncovers the truth about the kingpin, his life is in great danger, and Mike must decide where his own true loyalties lie.

Cast
 Richard Travis as Detective Lt. Pat Harrigan
 Eleanor Parker as Kitty Kelly
 Jack La Rue as Joe Genna
 Charles Lang as Mike Harrigan
 Cy Kendall as Capt. Butler
 Wade Boteler as Police Chief Delaney
 Mary Gordon as Mrs. Mary Kelly
 Harry Lewis as Harry Bronson
 Tod Andrews as Fritz Hummel (as Michael Ames)

References

External links
 
 
 
 

1944 films
1944 crime films
American crime films
American black-and-white films
1940s English-language films
Films directed by D. Ross Lederman
Films scored by William Lava
1940s American films